Castres Cathedral (Cathédrale Saint-Benoît de Castres), now the Roman Catholic church of Saint Benoît (Saint Benedict), is a historical religious building  in Castres, Languedoc, France.

It was formerly the seat of the bishop of Castres, but the diocese was not restored after the French Revolution and was added by the Concordat of 1801 to the Archdiocese of Albi.

The first cathedral was built in the 14th century after the creation of the diocese of Castres in 1317, along with a number of other dioceses created in the region after the suppression of the Albigensians. It was destroyed during the French Wars of Religion.

The present building which replaced it was constructed in the 16th and 17th centuries.

External links
Location

Former cathedrals in France
Churches in Tarn (department)